The 2012–13 Missouri Tigers men's basketball team represented the University of Missouri in the 2012–13 NCAA Division I men's basketball season. Their head coach was Frank Haith, who was in his second year at Missouri. The team played its home games at Mizzou Arena in Columbia, Missouri, and played its first season in the Southeastern Conference after leaving the Big 12 Conference.

Roster

Notes:
 For 2012–13 commitments, see the Missouri recruiting page at rivals.com, part of Yahoo! Sports.
 Jabari Brown transferred from Oregon after that school's fall 2011 term. He became eligible once Missouri's 2012 fall semester ended on December 14.
 Jordan Clarkson sat out the 2012–13 season due to NCAA transfer rules. He will have two more years of eligibility.
 Alex Oriakhi was immediately eligible this season because Connecticut was barred from NCAA postseason play in 2012–13, his only remaining season of eligibility, due to Academic Progress Rate violations.
 Michael Dixon, Jr., a senior guard who was expected to start, was suspended before the season for an unnamed violation of team rules. He had also been accused of sexual assault in August 2012, but local prosecutors decided not to file charges. On November 30, Missouri announced that Dixon, who had not played this season, had left the school and would transfer.

Schedule

|-
!colspan=12| Exhibition

|-
!colspan=12| Regular season

|-
!colspan=12| SEC Regular Season

|-
!colspan=12| 2013 SEC Tournament

|-
!colspan=12| 2013 NCAA tournament

|-

Summer European Exhibition Tour

Missouri competed in an exhibition trip to Europe in August. The NCAA allows teams 10 extra practices before international exhibition tours like these. With many new players Coach Haith wanted to use the extra playing time and practices to help build team chemistry similar to what Mizzou did in 2008–09 with the Canadian tour. The 08–09 team ended up 31–7 and made the NCAA tournament's Elite EightSource:

2012 Battle 4 Atlantis

On Thanksgiving weekend (Nov. 22–24), Missouri participated in a tournament held in the Bahamas. The eight-team field has been announced as Missouri, Stanford, Memphis, Northern Iowa, Duke, Minnesota, VCU, and Louisville.Source:

References 

Missouri
Missouri Tigers men's basketball seasons
Missouri
Missouri Tigers men's b
Missouri Tigers men's b